Club Nacional Táchira (usually called Nacional Táchira) was a professional club and the club has won one First Division title in the professional era. The club was based in Táchira.

History
The club was 2002 Torneo Clausura champion with 36 points, and classified to the Playoff Final.

Nacional Táchira was 2001-02 National champion, when defeated Estudiantes de Mérida in the finals.

Titles

National
Primera División Venezolana: 1
Winners (1): 2001-02

Football clubs in Venezuela
1996 establishments in Venezuela
Defunct football clubs in Venezuela